Benjamin Shaw is an English-Canadian musician and artist  based in Melbourne, Australia. He has recorded for a number of different labels but is a mainstay of Audio Antihero records. He also uses the monickers of Guppy and Megadead.

Biography
Benjamin Shaw released his debut EP "I Got the Pox, the Pox is What I Got" in October 2009 on Audio Antihero which saw airplay from BBC 6 Music on the Tom Ravenscroft, Gideon Coe, Steve Lamacq, Jon Holmes and Tom Robinson shows and positive reviews from publications such as The Skinny, The 405, The Music Fix, This Is Fake DIY, Clash Music and The Line of Best Fit who remarked "If you think you've heard the like of Benjamin Shaw before, think again. TLOBF recommended.".

In October 2011 it was announced on sites like Drowned in Sound, Bearded and This Is Fake DIY that he would be releasing first album, There's Always Hope, There's Always Cabernet. He began promoting the album with a series of sessions for the likes of The Fly, The 405, This Is Fake DIY, Triple R, The Line Of Best Fit, Dandelion Radio and Resonance FM.

The debut LP There's Always Hope, There's Always Cabernet was released on 21 November to positive reviews. Drowned in Sound called it "superb," Clash Music remarked that Shaw was "an outcast, a loner, a maverick and a freak. All of these are compliments," The Line of Best Fit claimed "you wouldn't want everyone (or anyone else) to sound to like Benjamin Shaw but I'm delighted someone does," Is This Music? awarded it 4/5 and called it "one of the better records of the year" and MusicOMH gave it 4/5 and hailed it as a "truly special album." Album tracks "The Birds Chirp & The Sun Shines" and "Interview" were given multiple plays on the Tom Ravenscroft and Gideon Coe BBC 6 Music shows, as were the album's first single "Somewhere Over the M6" and its B-side "Pig".

Shaw has played around the UK, Europe and Australia  with artists such as Darren Hayman, Tom Paley (New Lost City Ramblers), Jack Hayter (Ex-Hefner), Neil Pennycook (Meursault), Extradition Order, Paul Hawkins & The Awkward Silences, Runaround Kids, Little Red and The Owl Service. Shaw has also seen endorsements from Nic Dalton of The Lemonheads.

During a radio interview on 12 August 2012, Audio Antihero founder Jamie Halliday revealed that Benjamin Shaw was working on new material for a future release with the label. The first piece of new material to surface was the "T'ra F'now" instrumental on the Audio Antihero produced "Hüsker Doo-wop" Charity EP to raise money to repair damages to independent music organisations in New York following Hurricane Sandy. Shaw followed up his contribution to this charity EP with "This Christmas (I Just Want to be Left Alone)," a collaborative Christmas single with Fighting Kites to raise money for Shelter, Shaw also directed the music video. The single benefited from critical praise from online press and radio and saw support from Tom Robinson, Bush Radio, Jon Solomon's WPRB show and Rolling Stone.

On 14 January, it was announced that Benjamin Shaw would releasing a new instrumental record entitled Summer in the Box Room on the Glass Reservoir label in February 2013. Two tracks from the record were premiered by Robert Rotifer on 4FM and GoldFlakePaint praised it as a "special kind of dour musical genius." Tom Ravenscroft also aired tracks from the release on his BBC Radio 6 Music show.

Benjamin Shaw sometimes performs live with Neil Debnam (Fighting Kites/Broken Shoulder) and Kay Ishikawa (Comet Gain) as Benjamin Shaw Band.

Discography

Albums, EPs and compilations
I Got the Pox, the Pox is What I Got EP (Audio Antihero, 2009)
Rumfucker (Self-Release, 2010 / Rumfucker Recordings, 2016)
There's Always Hope, There's Always Cabernet (Audio Antihero, 2011)
Summer in the Box Room (Glass Reservoir, 2013)
Goodbye, Cagoule World (Audio Antihero, 2014)
Guppy (Kirigirisu Recordings, 2015)
One Day We'll Laugh About All This (Self-Released, 2016) as Guppy
Megadead (Audio Antihero / Kirigirsu Recordings, 2018)
Exciting Opportunities: A Collection of Sadness and Singles (Audio Antihero / Old Money Records, 2019)
Should've Stayed at Home: A Collection of Oddities and Outtakes (Audio Antihero / Old Money Records, 2019)
Live at donaufestival (Audio Antihero, 2019)
I Got the Pox, the Pox is What I Got (Remastered & Expanded) (Audio Antihero / Old Money Records, 2020)
There's Always Hope, There's Always Cabernet (Remastered & Expanded) (Audio Antihero / Old Money Records, 2020)
Screams, Banging, etc (Self-Released, 2020) as Megadead
Audio Visual Metro Computers (Self-Released, 2020) as Megadead
31 Songs About Murder (Self-Released, 2021) as Megadead
Authentic Country Music (Self-Released, 2021) as Megadead

Sessions
I Got the Pox, the Pox is What I Got – EP (Audio Antihero, 2009)
WVUM Sessions – Split with Broken Shoulder (BarelyOut Recordings, 2011)
Dandelion Session (BarelyOut Recordings, 2011)
The Shuttleworth Sessions (Self-Release, 2012)
The Waiting Room Session (BarelyOut Recordings, 2014)
Dandelion Sessions (BarelyOut Recordings, 2014)

Singles
"When I Fell Over in the City" / "The Carpeteer" (Audio Antihero, 2011)
"Somewhere Over the M6" (Audio Antihero, 2011)
"This Christmas (I Just Want to be Left Alone)" with Fighting Kites (Fika Recordings, 2011 / Audio Antihero, 2012)
"The Birds Chirp & The Sun Shines" (Audio Antihero, 2012)
"Goodbye, Kagoul World" (Audio Antihero, 2014)
"You & Me – EP" split with Jack Hayter, Cloud and Broken Shoulder (Audio Antihero, 2014)
"Terrible Feelings!" (Audio Antihero / Kirigirsu Recordings, 2018)
"A Brand New Day (Live at Donaufestival)" (Audio Antihero, 2019)
"Sad Dog Waiting for Pizza" (Self-Released, 2021) as Megadead
"It Goes / It Gone"(Self-Released, 2021) as Megadead
"Country" (Self-Released, 2021) as Megadead

Compilation appearances
Cigarettes & Eggnog (HI54LOFI, 2009) – contributes "It's Christmas Time (For God's Sake)" (Nosferatu D2 cover) and hidden track
Show Me A Word That Rhymes With Pavement (Filthy Little Angels, 2010) – contributes "Starlings of the Slipstream" (Pavement cover)
Bob Hope would – for Japan (Audio Antihero, 2011) – contributes "Kick The Dog" (Demo) / "When I Fell Over in the City" (Alt. Mix) and "Pig" + Artwork
Some.Alternate.Universe – for FSID (Audio Antihero, 2012) – contributes "Long Ago & Oh So Far Away" + Artwork
Audio Antihero's Commercial Suicide Sampler (Audio Antihero, 2012) – contributes "How To Test The Depth of a Well" + Artwork
The Hüsker Doo-wop EP for New York (Audio Antihero/Hear It For NY, 2012) – contributes "T'ra F'now"
Into The Light: Volume Two for Pussy Riot (Unwashed Territories, 2012) – contributes "This Christmas (I Just Want to be Left Alone)" with Fighting Kites
I Love You & Stuff (HI54LOFI, 2013) – contributes "Internet Girlfriend"
Audio Antihero Presents: "REGAL VS STEAMBOAT" for Rape Crisis (Audio Antihero, 2013) – contributes "Goodbye, Cagoule World (Live)" + Artwork
Five Long Years - (Audio Antihero, 2014) - contributes "Goodbye, Kagoul World" / "Hello Sunshine" (Hidden) + Artwork
New Emperors - (My Little Empire Records, 2015) - contributes "You & Me"
an electrical storm - (Aetheric Records, 2015) - contributes "Le Pleasure Beach"
BERN YR IDOLS (Bernie Sanders benefit compilation (Audio Antihero, 2016) - contributes "How to Test the Depth of a Well (Triple R Session)" + Artwork + Mastering
Audio Antihero Presents: "Unpresidented Jams" for SPLC & NILC - (Audio Antihero, 2017) - contributes "Hole" + Additional Mastering + Additional Design
The Desperation Club - A Cloud Tribute Compilation - (Audio Antihero, 2018) - contributes "Trees All Right" + Mastering (Tracks 2-35)
Fall 2018 - (Z Tapes, 2018) - contributes "Kick the Dog"
Elder Statesman: Nine Long Years of Audio Antihero Records (Audio Antihero, 2019) - contributes "You & Me" + Artwork
 Fighting Kites - Mustard After Dinner - An Anthology of Fighting Kites (Audio Antihero / Old Money Records, 2019) - contributes "This Christmas" (I Just Want to Be Left Alone) + Mastering
Vessels IX (Future Astronauts, 2021) - contributes "Tragedy, Doom & So On"
From the River to the Sea: The Horrible Truth About Palestine - a Fundraiser for the United Palestinian Appeal (Audio Antihero, 2021) - contributes "Chief of the Dead" / "Dead Kennedys" (with Broken Broken Bastard) + Artwork + Mastering

Other credits
Jack Hayter – Sucky Tart (Audio Antihero, 2011) – Artwork + Mastering
Broken Shoulder – Broken Shoulderrr (Audio Antihero, 2011) – Mastering
Wartgore Hellsnicker – Moderate Rock (Audio Antihero, 2011) – Artwork + Mastering
Paul Hawkins & The Awkward Silences – The Wrong Life (Audio Antihero, 2011) – Artwork
Fighting Kites & Broken Shoulder – Split (Audio Antihero, 2011) – Mastering (Tracks 5-7)
Paul Hawkins & The Awkward Silences – You Can't Make Somebody Love You / Of Course I Stole The Train (Audio Antihero, 2011) – Artwork
Broken Shoulder – Stiller Nite (Audio Antihero / Fika Recordings Calendar, 2011) – Artwork + Mastering
Nosferatu D2 – It's Christmas Time (For God's Sake) (Audio Antihero / Fika Recordings Calendar, 2011) – Artwork
Broken Shoulder – The Tape of Disquiet (Tape Your Mouth, 2012) – Mastering
Jack Hayter – The Shackleton (Audio Antihero, 2012) – Artwork + Mastering
Broken Shoulder – Holloway Exit Music / Fun Juice (Deathbomb Arc, 2012) – Mastering
Nosferatu D2 – Live at the Spitz (Audio Antihero/BarelyOut Recordings, 2012) – Remastering
Broken Shoulder – Crow Versus Crow session (BarelyOut Recordings, 2012) – Mastering
D.E.A.D. – S.T.I.L.L. D.E.A.D. (GM Sounds, 2012) – Artwork
a Singer of Songs – There is a Home for You (HI54LOFI, 2013) – Artwork
Jack Hayter – Quotes (Audio Antihero, 2013) – Artwork
Me and the Horse I Rode In On - Driving Home for Christmas (Self-Release, 2014) - Artwork
Broken Shoulder - 300 Bicycle Seats (Kirigirisu Recordings, 2014) - Mastering
Frog – Judy Garland (Audio Antihero, 2015) – Artwork
Me and the Horse I Rode In On - When You're Down (EardrumsPop, 2015) - Artwork
Frog – Kind of Blah (Audio Antihero, 2015) – Artwork
Frog – Photograph (Audio Antihero, 2015) – Design + Mastering (Track 2)
Nosferatu D2 – Older, Wiser, Sadder EP (Audio Antihero, 2015) – Design + Remastering
Frog – Catchyalater (Audio Antihero, 2016) – Remixer (Track 4) + Mastering (Tracks 3 & 4)
Charles Griffin Gibson – People (Self-Release, 2016) - Remastering
Charles Griffin Gibson – Pictures (Self-Release, 2016) - Remastering
CHUCK - My Band Is a Computer (Audio Antihero / Old Money Records) - Mastering
Broken Shoulder - Hashiridase (Kirigirisu Recordings, 2016) - Mastering
Magana - Inches Apart (Audio Antihero, 2017) - Remixer (Track 3) + Mastering (Tracks 2 & 3)
CHUCK - New Yorker (Audio Antihero, 2017) - Mastering
CHUCK - Cherry Tree (Audio Antihero, 2017) - Mastering
CHUCK - Frankenstein Songs for the Grocery Store (Audio Antihero, 2017) - Mastering
Max García Conover - Motorhome (Son Canciones, 2017) - Mastering
Magana - Oceans (Audio Antihero, 2017) - Mastering
CHUCK - Happy Birthday (Audio Antihero, 2017) - Remixer (Track 3) + Mastering
Cloud - Wildfire (Audio Antihero, 2018) - Mastering (Track 2)
Cloud - Two Hands Bound (Audio Antihero, 2018) - Mastering (Track 2)
Cloud - Me, Her & Lavender (Audio Antihero, 2018) - Mastering (Track 2)
Frog - Something to Hide (Audio Antihero, 2018) - Artwork
Frog - American (Audio Antihero, 2018) - Artwork
Frog - Bones (Audio Antihero, 2018) - Artwork
Frog - Whatever We Probably Already Had It (Audio Antihero, 2018) - Artwork
Nipped in the Bud - Fed Up With It (Kirigirisu Recordings, 2018) - Mastering
Atlanta Dream Season - Party in the Hospital / Great (The Popside, 2018) - Artwork
Frog - God Once Loved a Woman (Audio Antihero, 2019) - Artwork
Tempertwig - Comfort Blanket / Everything Can Be Derailed (Audio Antihero / Randy Sadage Records, 2019) - Artwork + Mastering
Tempertwig - This Means Everything / Randy Sadage Records, This Means Don't a Thing (Audio Antihero, 2019) - Artwork + Mastering
Tempertwig - Apricot (Audio Antihero / Randy Sadage Records, 2019) - Artwork + Mastering
Tempertwig - FAKE NOSTALGIA: An Anthology of Broken Stuff (Audio Antihero / Randy Sadage Records, 2019) - Artwork + Mastering
Tempertwig - Films Without Plotlines EP (Audio Antihero / Randy Sadage Records, 2019) - Artwork + Mastering
Frog - Black Friday (Audio Antihero / Tape Wormies, 2019) - Artwork
Frog - It's Something I Do (Audio Antihero / Tape Wormies, 2019) - Artwork
Frog - Count Bateman (Audio Antihero / Tape Wormies, 2019) - Artwork
Broken Shoulder - Shark Islands: A Broken Shoulder Archipelago (Audio Antihero / Old Money Records, 2019) - Artwork + Mastering
Atlanta Dream Season - Green Means Stop (The Popside, 2020) - Remixer (Track 1)

References

External links 
Benjamin Shaw official site
Benjamin Shaw's BBC profile 
Benjamin Shaw's Audio Antihero profile
Benjamin Shaw's Last.FM profile
Benjamin Shaw's TLOBF profile
Benjamin Shaw interview with This Is Fake DIY
405 Focus Session

Year of birth missing (living people)
Living people
English rock musicians
English folk musicians